City Stars may refer to:

Cleveland City Stars, a former association football club in Ohio
FC City Stars, an association football club in Lahti, Finland
Nairobi City Stars, an association football club in Kenya
Oxford City Stars, an ice hockey team in England